Ante Šimundža (born 28 September 1971) is a Slovenian professional football manager and former player.

Club career
Šimundža started his career at hometown club Železničar Maribor at the age of ten, and moved to NK Maribor after Slovenia's independence in 1991. He stayed there for six seasons, scoring 64 league goals in 170 appearances. He played for a number of different foreign clubs between 1997 and 1998, however, plagued by constant ankle injuries he soon returned to Maribor. There he was an important part of Maribor's qualification to the UEFA Champions League during the 1999–2000 season. He was the scorer of the winning goal in the first round of the group stage when Maribor defeated Dynamo Kyiv 1–0, which is to date the only victory of any Slovenian club in this phase of the competition. In 2001, he again moved abroad and played for La Louvière, before returning to his native country and finishing his professional career with Aluminij and Šmartno ob Paki. Šimundža has made a total of 256 Slovenian PrvaLiga appearances, scoring 87 goals in the process. Considered a Maribor club legend, he is tied with Gregor Židan as a player with the most appearances for the club during the 1990s.

International career
Šimundža has been capped three times for the Slovenia national football team between 1993 and 1999.

Managerial career
Šimundža began his coaching career at his hometown club Železničar Maribor, where he was coaching youth selections. He started his senior coaching career in 2007, when he was appointed as an assistant coach of Pavel Pinni at Celje. In 2008, he became an assistant of Darko Milanič at Maribor. He was part of Maribor's sports department until 2011 when he was selected as a head coach of Mura 05. His season with Mura 05 was impressive and he turned the team around, changing it from a relegation contender to the eventual UEFA competitions qualifier, as the club finished third during the 2011–12 Slovenian PrvaLiga season. By the end of his first season as head coach, he was nominated for the best coach in the league. He then accepted an offer from Austrian side GAK, signing with the club in June 2012. However, the club went bankrupt a few months later and Šimundža returned to Mura 05 in early 2013. After the 2012–13 season, Mura 05 also went bankrupt, and Šimundža took over the Slovenian Second League side Aluminij in June 2013.

In September 2013, Šimundža has been appointed as the new manager of Slovenian champions Maribor. With Maribor, he won two national titles (2013–14 and 2014–15), and also qualified for the group stages of the 2014–15 UEFA Champions League. He resigned in August 2015 after losing 3–0 at home against Maribor's biggest rivals, Olimpija Ljubljana.

In June 2017, Šimundža once again took charge at Mura. With the club, he won the 2019–20 edition of the Slovenian Football Cup, clinching their first major trophy in 25 years. The following year, Mura became the Slovenian champion for the first time after winning the 2020–21 Slovenian PrvaLiga season. In the last round of the season, Šimundža defeated his former club Maribor to win the title. After four years at the club, he left by mutual consent in December 2021.

On 3 January 2022, Šimundža joined Bulgarian First League club Ludogorets Razgrad as their new head coach. He led the team to its eleventh consecutive league title in the 2021–22 season, before being sacked on 7 March 2023 following a 1–0 home defeat against Pirin Blagoevgrad.

Personal life
Šimundža was born in Maribor, present day Slovenia, as the youngest of two children, with his sister being six years older than him. His father was a Croat from Split and his mother a Slovene from Kidričevo. He is married and has two sons, Luka and Jure, who were named after their grandfathers.

Honours

Manager
Maribor
Slovenian First League: 2013–14, 2014–15
Slovenian Supercup: 2014

Mura
Slovenian First League: 2020–21
Slovenian Second League: 2017–18
Slovenian Cup: 2019–20

Ludogorets Razgrad
Bulgarian First League: 2021–22
Bulgarian Supercup: 2022

References

External links
ÖFB profile 
NZS profile 

1971 births
Living people
Sportspeople from Maribor
Slovenian people of Croatian descent
Slovenian footballers
Slovenian expatriate footballers
Association football forwards
NK Železničar Maribor players
NK Maribor players
Vegalta Sendai players
BSC Young Boys players
Malmö FF players
R.A.A. Louviéroise players
NK Aluminij players
NK Šmartno ob Paki players
Slovenian PrvaLiga players
Japan Football League (1992–1998) players
Allsvenskan players
Belgian Pro League players
Slovenian Second League players
Expatriate footballers in Japan
Expatriate footballers in Switzerland
Expatriate footballers in Sweden
Expatriate footballers in Belgium
Expatriate footballers in Austria
Slovenian expatriate sportspeople in Japan
Slovenian expatriate sportspeople in Switzerland
Slovenian expatriate sportspeople in Sweden
Slovenian expatriate sportspeople in Belgium
Slovenian expatriate sportspeople in Austria
Slovenia under-21 international footballers
Slovenia international footballers
Slovenian football managers
ND Mura 05 managers
Grazer AK managers
NK Maribor managers
PFC Ludogorets Razgrad managers
Slovenian expatriate football managers
Expatriate football managers in Austria
Expatriate football managers in Bulgaria
Slovenian expatriate sportspeople in Bulgaria